Pereira is a surname in the Portuguese and Galician languages, well known and quite common, mostly in Portugal, the Galicia region of Spain, Brazil, other regions of the former Portuguese Empire, among Galician descendants in Spanish-speaking Latin America and by adoption also common among Sephardic Jews of Portuguese origin throughout the Sephardic Jewish diaspora. Currently, it is one of the most common surnames in South America and Europe.

It was originally a noble Christian toponym of the Middle Ages, taken from the feudal possession of Pereira, Portugal, which in Portuguese means 'pear tree'.

The variants of this name are more commonly found in other countries such as Spain, Trinidad and Tobago, India (specifically between Goa and Kerala along the Konkan coast), Pakistan and Sri Lanka. Pereire, for example, is a French variant. Many Portuguese immigrants to the United States, especially Massachusetts, chose to Americanize their surname to Perry.

As a toponymic surname, it does not refer to a single lineage with a single founder, but to various unrelated lineages.

People
See also Pereyra and Perera.

Politics
Anália de Victória Pereira (1941–2009), Angolan politician
Aristides Pereira (1923–2011), Cape Verdean politician
Carlina Pereira (c. 1926 – 2011), Cape Verdean politician
Fernando "Cobo" Pereira (born 1963), officer of São Tomé and Príncipe
Gabriel Antonio Pereira (1794–1861), Uruguayan politician and President of Uruguay 
António Pestana Garcia Pereira (20/21st century), Portuguese lawyer and politician
Henrique Pereira Rosa (1946–2013), politician from Guinea-Bissau
Ignatius Xavier Pereira (1888-1951), Indian Tamil-Sri Lankan businessman and politician
José Maria Pereira Neves (born 1960), Cape Verdean politician and Prime Minister of Cape Verde
José Pacheco Pereira (born 1949), Portuguese politician and intellectual
Tomás Romero Pereira (1886–1982), Paraguayan politician and President of Paraguay
Venceslau Brás Pereira Gomes (1868–1966), Brazilian politician and President of Brazil
Juan Isidro Jimenes Pereyra (1846–1919), Dominican political figure
Julio César Pereyra (born 1951), the mayor of Florencio Varela, Buenos Aires, Argentina since 2003
Pereira Silima (born 1959), Tanzanian politician

Music and dance
Alexander Pereira (born 1947), head of La Scala
Linda Perry (Pereira) (born 1965), American record producer, songwriter, singer
Erica Pereira, New York City Ballet soloist
Steve Perry (Pereira) (born 1949), American singer
Luciano Pereyra (born 1981), Argentine singer
Luis Pereyra (born 1965), dancer and choreographer of Tango Argentino and Argentinian folklore
Joe Perry (Pereira) (born 1950), American rock guitarist, vocalist, and songwriter
David Pereira (born 1953), Australian classical cellist
Poppy (Moriah Rose Pereira) (born 1995), American singer and YouTube personality
Linn da Quebrada (Lina Pereira), Brazilian singer, actor, and screenwriter
Tina Pereira, Trinidadian-Canadian ballet dancer

Sports
Adrian Pereira (born 1999), Norwegian footballer
Alex Pereira (born 1987), Brazilian kickboxer
Aloysius Pereira (1859–1935), Anglo-Indian cricketer
Álvaro Pereira (born 1985), Uruguayan football player
Ana Paula Pereira da Silva Villela (born 1997), Brazilian women's footballer
Andreas Pereira (born 1996), Brazilian footballer
Bob Pereyra (born 1963), American street luge racer
Carlos Pereyra (born 1911), Argentine boxer
Daniel Pereira (born 1976), Argentine-Uruguayan footballer
Danilo Pereira (born 1991), Portuguese footballer
Darío Pereyra (born 1956), Uruguayan football player
Derrick Pereira (born 1962), Indian football player
Edward Pereira (1866–1939), English cricketer and educationalist
Gabriel Pereyra (born 1978), Argentine footballer playing in Mexico
Guillermo Pereyra (born 1980), Argentine-Italian footballer
Jackie Pereira (born 1964), Australian field hockey striker
Jair Pereira (born 1986), Mexican football player
James Pereira (born 1983), Brazilian boxer
João José Pereira (born 1987), Portuguese triathlete
Juan Pablo Pereyra (born 1984), Argentine footballer
María del Pilar Pereyra (born 1978), Argentine swimmer
Matheus Pereira (born 1996), Brazilian footballer
Maxi Pereira, Uruguayan football player
Mike Pereira, (NFL) Vice President of Officiating
Mito Pereira (born 1995), Chilean professional golfer
Nuno Miguel Soares Pereira Ribeiro Gomes, Portuguese football player
Nuno Jorge Pereira Silva Valente, Portuguese football player
Ricardo Pereira (born 1976), Portuguese football player
Ricardo Pereira (born 1993), Portuguese football player
Roberto Pereyra (born 1991), Argentine footballer
Sanson Pereira (born 1997), Indian footballer 
T. J. Pereira (born 1976), Brazilian jockey
Teliana Pereira (born 1988), Brazilian tennis player
Thiago Pereira (born 1986), Brazilian swimmer
Thisara Perera (born 1989), Sri Lankan cricketer
Thomas Pereira (born 1973), Norwegian footballer
Vítor Melo Pereira (born 1957), Portuguese football referee
Viviane Pereira (born 1993), Brazilian mixed martial artist

Others 
Baron Diego Pereira D' Aguilar, 1st Baron d'Aguilar (1699–1759), Jewish financier
Baron Ephraim Lopes Pereira D'Aguilar, 2nd Baron d'Aguilar (1739–1802) Jewish financier
Audrey Brown-Pereira, Cook Islands diplomat
Benedict Pereira, Spanish Jesuit priest
Brendan Pereira, Indian advertising executive
Cecil Pereira (1869–1942), British Army officer, commanded 2nd Division during World War I
Duarte Pacheco Pereira, Portuguese explorer
E. O. Eustace Pereira, Sri Lankan Burgher engineer and academic, Vice Chancellor of the University of Ceylon
Fernando Pereira, Dutch photographer
Florent Pereira (1952-2020), Indian journalist and film actor
Francisco de Assis Pereira, Brazilian serial killer
Galeote Pereira, 16th-century Portuguese soldier, trader and travel writer (China)
George Pereira, British explorer of Central Asia, diplomat, general and author
Hal Pereira (1905–1983), American production designer and architect
Henry Pereira (1845–1926), Anglican Suffragan bishop
Henry Pereira Mendes (1852–1937), American rabbi
Irene Rice Pereira (1902–1971), American abstract artist, writer, painter
Jacob Rodrigues Pereira (1715–1780), one of the inventors of manual language for the deaf
João Gilberto Prado Pereira de Oliveira (1931–2019), Brazilian musician
Jonathan Pereira (1804–1853), British pharmacologist
Julia Pereira, Brazilian model
Kevin Pereira (born 1982), American TV host
Marco Pereira (born 1950), Brazilian musician
Michaela Pereira (born 1970), Canadian television personality
Nuno Álvares Pereira (1360–1431), canonized Portuguese medieval general
Sam Pereira (born 1950), American poet
Simeon Anthony Pereira (1927–2006), Pakistani Catholic priest, 3rd Archbishop of Karachi
Soeiro Pereira Gomes (1901–1949), Portuguese writer
Steve Pereira (20th century), British born editor, poet and writer
William Pereira (1909–1985), American architect
Abraham Israel Pereyra (died 1699), "Portuguese merchant of the Jewish nation" who lived in Amsterdam
Virginia Pereira Álvarez (1882–1947), first Venezuelan woman to study medicine in Venezuela

See also
Comet Pereyra (formal designations: C/1963 R1, 1963 V, and 1963e) was a bright comet which appeared in 1963
Pereira da Silva
Perera

References

Origin of the Pereira surname in Portuguese genealogical site

Jewish surnames
Portuguese-language surnames
Galician-language surnames
Sephardic surnames
Surnames of Uruguayan origin